Vow And Declare (foaled 17 October 2015) is an Australian bred thoroughbred racehorse that was the winner of the 2019 Melbourne Cup.

Background
Vow And Declare was bred by Paul Lanskey,  the owner of the broodmare, Geblitzt.   Declaration of War sired the horse whilst performing shuttle stallion duties for Coolmore Stud in Australia. Lanskey named the horse after his father's habit of coming home from the pub and saying "I vow and declare I've only had a few beers".

At the 2017 Inglis Classic Sale, Vow And Declare had a reserve price of $70,000 however only received a bid of up to $45,000.  The horse was therefore retained by breeder Paul Lanskey and ownership was divided by Lanskey and others.

Racing career
Trained by Danny O'Brien at Flemington Racecourse, Vow And Declare was unraced as a 2 year old.  He claimed his first win as a 3 year old at his fourth start in a Warrnambool maiden run over 2381m in October 2018.

At his next start, Vow And Declare was successful over 1800 metres at Flemington in the Listed TCL TV Stakes when ridden by Damien Oliver.

In June 2019, he ran 2nd in the Group 1 Queensland Derby at odds of 25/1.  Jockey Damien Oliver lodged a protest against the winner Mr Quickie however the protest was dismissed by stewards.

Two weeks later the horse won the Tattersall's Cup over 3000 metres at Eagle Farm Racecourse as a 2/1 favourite when ridden by Glen Boss.

Vow And Declare resumed racing as a 4 year old with a 4th placing in the Turnbull Stakes and a second placing in the Caulfield Cup.  He started at 10/1 when successful in the 2019 Melbourne Cup when ridden by Craig Williams.

Following a 5th in The Bart Cummings and a 6th in the Caulfield Cup, finishing both within 2 lengths of the winner, Vow And Declare was also entered in the 2022 Melbourne Cup.  He drew barrier number 4 and was given 54 kg weight with Blake Shinn aboard.  He was placed 10th, 8.7 lengths behind the winner Gold Trip.

Pedigree

References 
 

Racehorses bred in Australia
2015 racehorse births
Racehorses trained in Australia
Melbourne Cup winners
Thoroughbred family 9-c